Julien Lorthioir (born 18 November 1983 in Douai) is a French professional football player. Currently, he plays in the Championnat National for Paris FC.

He played on the professional level in Ligue 1 and Ligue 2 for CS Sedan Ardennes.

1983 births
Living people
French footballers
Ligue 1 players
Ligue 2 players
CS Sedan Ardennes players
Tours FC players
Paris FC players
Association football midfielders
People from Douai
Sportspeople from Nord (French department)
Footballers from Hauts-de-France